The Cleveland mayoral election of 1943 saw the reelection of Frank Lausche.

General election

References

Mayoral elections in Cleveland
Cleveland mayoral
Cleveland
November 1943 events
1940s in Cleveland